The 2002 East Carolina Pirates football team was an American football team that represented East Carolina University as a member of Conference USA during the 2002 NCAA Division I-A football season. In their eleventh season under head coach Steve Logan, the team compiled a 4–8 record (4–5 in Conference USA).

Schedule

References

East Carolina
East Carolina Pirates football seasons
East Carolina Pirates football